Spider-Man series may refer to:

 List of Spider-Man titles, a list of Spider-Man comic book series
 Spider-Man television series, animation and live action on TV.
 Spider-Man book series, appearences in series of books
 Spider-Man in film, the Spider-Man motion pictures.